Epol/Apple was a Philippine educational children's television series produced by the E-Media program of ABS-CBN Foundation (later the ABS-CBN Lingkod Kapamilya Foundation) and the Department of Education, Culture and Sports (DECS; now the Department of Education). It aired on ABS-CBN from 1999 to its final episode in 2004 next to Sine'skwela and Math-Tinik. It is the ABS-CBN's only educational television series in English.

Cast
Emman Abeleda as Kenneth
Bryan Homecillo as Rap-Rap
Marick Dacanay as Mary Grace
Jiro Manio as Jiro
Nina de Sagun as Jeanne
Joseph Lindo Roble as Otep
Toots Javellana as Porfirio
Bodjie Pascua as Kuya/Tito Luis                                            
Audie Gemora as Miguel
Isa Fabregas as Kiara
Michlee Lagdameo as Pilar
Monique Wilson
Julia Clarete
Apollo Sheikh Abraham
Icko Gonzalez

Production
The series' headwriter is Sarah Fernando Lumba. One of the episode directors is Rene Guidote, who has also directed Sine'skwela, Bayani, Pahina and other educational series made by ABS-CBN Foundation.
As with other educational television programs from the ABS-CBN Foundation and DECS, a single episode of Epol/Apple took between three to nine months to make from conception to approval.

In 2001, Bodjie Pascua as Luis replaced Audie Gemora as Miguel while Emman Abeleda, Marick Dacanay and Toots Javellana were retained from the 1st Incarnation of the series.

Music
The "Epol/Apple Theme" was sung by Jim Paredes and Lynn Sherman, with lyrics by Gina Fernandez and music arranged by Paredes. The series composers were Noel Argosino and Froilan Malimban, who also provided sound effects for the series. The song "Goodbye My Friend" was written by headwriter Sarah Fernando Lumba and composed by Liezel Anne Tiamzon.

In the 2002 episode about introductions, the song "What Is Your Name?" was written by Libay Linsangan-Cantor and arranged by Tiamzon. In the first episode about ownership, the song "Is That Your __?" was written by Dang Bagas and arranged by Mike Mella, while in the second episode about ownership, the song "Are Those Your Toys __?" was written by Divine Love Salvador and also arranged by Mella.

Partial list of songs

Accolades

Reruns
Reruns of the show are currently aired on ABS-CBN-owned educational channel Knowledge Channel from the channel's launch in 1999.

From June 13 to September 5, 2020, reruns of the show were aired on Kapamilya Channel.

See also
Sine'skwela
Hiraya Manawari
Bayani
Math-Tinik

References

1999 Philippine television series debuts
2004 Philippine television series endings
1990s Philippine television series
ABS-CBN original programming
Children's education television series
English-language education television programming
Philippine children's television series
Philippine educational television series
Philippine television shows featuring puppetry